Randia pleiomeris is a species of plant in the family Rubiaceae. It is found in El Salvador and Guatemala. It is threatened by habitat loss.

Sources 

pleiomeris
Data deficient plants
Taxonomy articles created by Polbot